How to Train Your Dragon: The Hidden World (Original Motion Picture Soundtrack) is the score album to the 2019 film How to Train Your Dragon: The Hidden World, the sequel to How to Train Your Dragon 2 (2014) and the third and final installment in the How to Train Your Dragon trilogy. Recurring DreamWorks composer John Powell who scored for the previous two instalments in the franchise, returned to the third film. The album features an original song "Together From Afar" performed by Jónsi, released as a single on January 31, 2019. The album was released on February 1, by Back Lot Music and received positive critical response from music critics.

Development 

Unlike the first two films in the franchise, the score for Hidden World has a "dark theme" for the main antagonist, dragon-hunter Grimmel, a "fate" riff, which signalled changes in the lives of key characters, lighthearted romantic music for Toothless and the potential mate, as well as "mystical, ethereal sounds for that “hidden world” of the dragons themselves". Powell felt that for the film, he had to come to the studio at five-o-clock in the morning and write the score at closed doors, as "he had to go to these slightly indulgent, dark, sad places to find things that might be potent for other people".

He also brought his earlier themes, and also reproduced them to create newer versions and integrate it in the film, as "if he had kept using material that everybody knew all the way through the movie, you wouldn’t have felt it as significantly as you do at the end". He produced a varied soundscape, including playful sounds for dragon romps, orchestral sounds for the battle sequences, string march for the Vikings' exodus, a celebratory song ("Together From Afar") in the conclusion, as well as unusual instrumental colors to convey the ancient world. He made use of multiple instruments such as Celtic harp, bodhrán frame drum, uilleann pipes, traditional Scottish bagpipes, and backing vocals which were provided by Jónsi (who provided for the music of How to Train Your Dragon 2). He also recorded the original song "Together From Afar".

Powell added that, one of the challenging sequence was when Toothless woos the mysterious Light Fury on a beach, where he came with a "delicate melody with a dance-like rhythm" which he expanded into a seven-minute cue using the classical form of passacaglia. He called it as "one of several special moments that are music-driven, without dialogue".

Recording 
The score was recorded at the Abbey Road Studios in London on October 2018. Unlike his previous films, John used a full orchestra for this film, which consisted of 98 musicians, eight ethnic-music soloists and a 60-member vocal choir. Grammy-winning choral composer-arranger Eric Whitacre, whom Powell worked on Kung Fu Panda (2008), conducted the choir in various texts and translated them into Gaelic and Latin. The film's director Dean DeBlois and Cressida Cowell, the author of the children's book series whose writings and illustrations inspired the films, and also worked on the film adaptations as an executive producer, supervised the recording sessions. The one hour and thirty three-minute long music was recorded within nine days.

Track listing

Reception

Critical response 
Zanobard Reviews gave 9/10 to the score and wrote "John Powell’s score to How To Train Your Dragon: The Hidden World is just marvelous. He introduces a number of amazing new themes as well as bringing back all your favourites from the previous movies, and intertwines them expertly with his frankly ridiculously over-the-top action scoring (but that’s why we love it). The album not only serves as a very solid third entry to the musical franchise but also as an epic and absolutely brilliant conclusion to his masterful trilogy. The first film’s score still just edges this one, but it’s got the second movie beaten, that’s for sure. It’s a superb soundtrack, and one that was most definitely worth the wait."

Critic Jonathan Broxton wrote "John Powell has created what might be his defining film music legacy. Of course he’s still young, and so he still has plenty of time to write something that will top it; also, for the sake of argument, some people may say that his music for the Bourne films is just as influential. The entire How to Train Your Dragon series is a bonafide masterpiece, a gloriously bold and colorful fantasy of Viking life, heroes and dragons, honor and friendship and grand adventure. Everything points to How to Train Your Dragon: The Hidden World being the last film in this series and, if so, Powell has ended on a high. It won’t get an Oscar nomination, because sequels like this never do, but this will still be riding high as one of the scores of the year."

Filmtracks.com wrote "Powell does not introduce new themes for these concepts explicitly, but he does offer a wide enough breadth of fresh identities to accompany their general purposes. The dragons' themes have been condensed into several motifs to represent the two leads of their kind, the Berk theme is displaced by a new one for another island, the flying and friendship themes are supplanted by new heroic alternatives, and other major new locations and characters are afforded appropriate ideas of their own. The inclusion of a theme and submotif for fate ties all of them together by the end." James Southall of Movie Wave wrote "With the first score having come in the first year of the 2010s and the final one in the last, this trilogy of music frames a decade of film music in which it has played a very notable part. While perhaps this third instalment doesn’t quite have a track to rival “Test Drive” or “Flying with Mother” (“Armada Battle” and “Once There Were Dragons” do come close) it is still for the most part of the highest quality and shows off again what a fine composer John Powell is. The films obviously held special meaning for him and his family and his emotion shines through all through it."

Accolades

Piano solos 
On May 15, 2020, Powell released an album titled Piano Solos from How to Train Your Dragon: The Hidden World, through his own record label. The album features nine tracks from Powell's original score, arranged for solo piano and performed by Powell's frequent collaborator Batu Sener. The arrangements from this album are printed and distributed by Hal Leonard Publishing Company.

Track listing

Personnel 
Credits adapted from CD liner notes.

 Music By – John Powell
 Additional music and arrangements – Anthony Willis, Batu Sener, Paul Mounsey
 Programming – Satnam Ramgotra
 Recording – Erik Swanson, Nick Wollage
 Engineer – Lewis Jones
 Mixing – Shawn Murphy, John Traunwieser
 Mastering – Patricia Sullivan
 Music editor – Jack Dolman, David Channing
 Music preparation – Gregory Jamrok, Mark Graham
 Gaelic advisor – Julie Fowlis
 Instruments
 Bagpipes – Red Hot Chilli Pipers
 Bassoon – Gavin McNaughton, Rachel Simms, Daniel Jemison
 Bodhrán – Kieran Leonard
 Clarinet – Anthony Pike, David Fuest, Nick Rodwell
 Flute – Anna Noakes, Helen Keen, Karen Jones
 French Horn – Corinne Bailey, David Pyatt, Laurence Davies, Mike Thmpson, Nick Hougham, Phil Woods, Phillip Eastop, Richard Berry, Simon Rayner, Richard Watkins
 Harp – Helen Tunstall, Skaila Kanga, Maeve Gilchrist
 Oboe – Jane Marshall, Janey Miller, John Anderson
 Percussion – Chris Baron, Dave Elliott, Gary Kettel, Glyn Matthews, Paul Clarvis, Frank Ricotti
 Piano, Celesta – Dave Hartley
 Solo vocal – Dee Lewis Clay, Jónsi
 Timpani – Jeremy Cornes, Bill Lockhart
 Trombone – Amos Miller, Ed Tarrant, Lyndon Meredith, Andy Wood
 Trumpet – Andy Crowley, Dan Newell, Kate Moore, Simon Munday, Philip Cobb
 Tuba – Owen Slade
 Uilleann pipes – Callum Stewart
 Violin – Alison Harling, Alison Kelly, Bea Lovejoy, Boguslaw Kostecki, Cathy Thompson, Charlie Brown, Chris Tombling, Christina Emmanuel, Dai Emanuel, Daniel Bhattacharya, Dave Woodcock, Debbie Widdup, Elizabeth Cooney, Everton Nelson, Fiona Brett, Ian Humphries, Jackie Shave, Jackie Hartley, Jeremy Isaac, Jim McLeod, Jo Archard, John Mills, Laura Melhuish, Maciej Rakowski, Mark Berrow, Natalia Bonner, Patrick Kiernan, Philippa Ibbotson, Rita Manning, Sarah Sexton, Tom Pigott-Smith, Warren Zielinski, Perry Montague-Mason
 Woodwind – Jan Hendrickse
 Choir
 Choir – Eric Whitacre Singers
 Choir recording – Pete Cobbin
 Choir conductor – Eric Whitacre
 Orchestra
 Orchestration  – Andrew Kinney, Geoff Lawson, Jon Kull, Randy Kerber, Rick Giovinazzo, Tommy Laurence
 Supervising orchestration – John Ashton Thomas
 Orchestra leader – Emlyn Singleton
 Orchestra conductor – Gavin Greenaway
 Orchestra contractor – Susie Gillis

References 

2019 soundtrack albums
Back Lot Music soundtracks
How to Train Your Dragon
Action film soundtracks
Fantasy film soundtracks
Animated film soundtracks
John Powell (film composer) soundtracks